Willi Rutz (7 January 1907 – 20 November 1993), nicknamed Knölle, was a German footballer and manager who played as an inside left and made one appearance for the Germany national team.

Career
Rutz earned his first and only cap for Germany on 1 July 1932, in a friendly against Finland. He scored Germany's second goal to give the team a 2–1 lead in the match, which was played in Helsinki and finished as a 4–1 win.

Personal life
Rutz died on 20 November 1993, at the age of 86.

Career statistics

International

International goals

References

External links
 
 
 
 
 

1907 births
1993 deaths
German footballers
Germany international footballers
Association football inside forwards
VfB Stuttgart players
Rot-Weiss Frankfurt players
German football managers
Association football player-managers
Stuttgarter Kickers managers
VfB Stuttgart managers